Organasm is the fourth full-length studio album by the Australian progressive metal band, Alchemist. It was issued in Australia by Chatterbox, with D.W. Norton producing, on 6 March 2000 as their first release with the label. It was supported by a three-month Australian tour alongside the bands, Cryogenic and Psi.Kore. Organasm featured generally shorter songs than the previous Alchemist albums, but was still rated highly by critics.

Dutch label Displeased released the album in Europe in 2000 and Relapse handled the American release. Tracks 2 to 4 are each listed as part of the "Evolution Trilogy", which comprises a musical movement. A demo version of the lead track, "Austral Spectrum", had appeared on a 1999 compilation album.

Reception 

Eduardo Rivadavia of AllMusic wrote that "[the album] is so complex and original that it defies a summary definition, but one might describe it as a psychedelic-prog-soundtrack-death metal album." He describes Adam Agius' vocal style as "akin to Entombed wrestling with Pink Floyd" and suggested the "Evolution" trilogy evoked the spirit of early Rush.

Track listing

Credits

 Adam Agius – vocals, guitar, keyboards
 Rodney Holder – drums, bongos
 John Bray – bass guitar
 Roy Torkington – guitar, artwork, layout and design

Release history

References 

2000 albums
Alchemist (band) albums
Relapse Records albums